Medchal−Malkajgiri district is a district in the Indian state of Telangana. Shamirpet is the headquarter of the district. It is the second most populous district with a population of 25 lakh and also 91.40% urbanized district in the state of Telangana, standing next only to Hyderabad district which has a population of 40 lakhs. The district shares boundaries with Hyderabad, Medak, Sangareddy, Y. Bhuvanagiri, Siddipet and Rangareddy districts.The most part of the district consist of Hyderabad City (GHMC)

Geography 

The district is spread over an area of .It is situated 505 metres above sea level. The landmark consists of rocky terrain and monolithic rocks in the outskirts of the city.

Demographics 
 census of India, the district is the second most populous district in the state with a population of 2,440,073.

Administrative divisions 
The district will have two revenue divisions of Keesara and Malkajgiri. They are sub-divided into 15 mandals. Sri V. Venkateswarlu, IAS is the new collector of the district.

Mandals 

The below table categorizes mandals into their respective revenue divisions in the district:

See also 
 List of districts in Telangana

References

External links 

 Official website

Districts of Telangana